Baalyaprathijna is a 1972 Indian Malayalam film, directed and produced by A. S. Nagarajan. The film stars Sathyan, Sheela, Adoor Bhasi and Kottayam Santha in the lead roles. The film had musical score by K. K. Antony.

Cast

Sathyan as Chandran
Sheela as Kusuma
Adoor Bhasi as Paappan
Kottayam Santha as Ammini
Muthukulam Raghavan Pillai as Omkara Pilla
Sankaradi as Muthalali
Rajan as Soman
Baby Indira as Bala Kusuma
Bahadoor as Appu
Bindu as Mother
K. P. Ummer as Vijayan
Khadeeja as Parvathi
Mani Varughese as House owner
Master Chandrasekharan as Bala Soman
Master Deenachandran as Bala Vijayan
Master Shivarama Babu as Bala Chandran
Pothuvan as Teacher
Rathidevi as Nalini
Vanaja as Mallika
Vasudevan as Shankaran

Soundtrack
The music was composed by K. K. Antony and the lyrics were written by P. Bhaskaran.

References

External links
 

1972 films
1970s Malayalam-language films